Patrick Béon (born 5 February 1950) is a French former professional racing cyclist. His sporting career began with ACBB Paris. He rode in three editions of the Tour de France, from 1975 through 1977. His team leader, Bernard Thévenet, won the general classification of the Tour de France in 1975 and 1977.

In 1976, Patrick Beon was selected to represent France in the road race at the Cycling World Championships.

In 2000, Beon was arrested and charged with trafficking illegal substances. And, in 2002, he was sentenced to two years in prison.

In 2009, Patrick Beon (with Florian Joyard) wrote an autobiography, "Nu dans mes bottes".

References

External links
 

1950 births
Living people
French male cyclists
Sportspeople from Ille-et-Vilaine
Cyclists from Brittany
21st-century French people
20th-century French people